

Expeditions, field work, and fossil discoveries

Institutions and organizations

Natural history museums

Scientific organizations

Scientific advances

Paleoanthropology

Paleobotany

Evolutionary biology

Exopaleontology

Extinction research

Micropaleontology

Invertebrate paleozoology

Trace fossils

Vertebrate paleozoology

Research techniques

Fossil trade

Law and politics

Regulation of fossil collection, transport, or sale

Fossil-related crime

Official symbols

Protected areas

Ethics and practice

Hoaxes

Scandals

Unethical practice

People

Births

Awards and recognition

Deaths

Historiography and anthropology of paleontology

Pseudoscience

Popular culture

Amusement parks and attractions

Art

Comics

Film

Gaming

Literature
 The Fossil Spirit: A Boy's Dream of Geology by John Mill was published. The story features a fakir from Hindostan telling a group of boys about his past lives as prehistoric creatures across geologic time. One such life as was lived as an Iguanodon who was attacked by a Megalosaurus. Apart from this fight scene, paleontologist William A. S. Sarjeant has dismissed the book as a "singularly turgid and heavily didactic text."

Philately

Television

References

1850s in paleontology
Paleontology